An Crom Ua Donnubáin or Crom O'Donovan (slain 1254) is the individual characterized as the ancestor of  O'Donovans later found in Carbery in County Cork, and later still in distant County Wexford in Leinster. Nothing is known for sure of his life but his progeny, and the circumstances of his slaying and further events which followed. He was the son of Máel Ruanaid, (son of Ragnall), son of Aneislis, son of Murchad, son of Amlaíb, son of Cathal, son of Donnubán, (son of Amlaíb), son of Cathal. An uncle or near relation was Amlaíb Ua Donnubáin, last known king of Uí Chairpre Áebda (Cairbre Eva), slain in 1201.

Events and context
The compilation of primarily Munster annals known as Mac Carthaigh's Book, collected by the celebrated Prince and historian Florence MacCarthy, reports the events several years after Crom's death as follows:

This Fínghin Reanna Róin is none other than Fínghin Mac Carthaigh, King of Desmond, who two years later would be the victor at the Battle of Callann, and whose father Donal Gott MacCarthy, also King of Desmond, was the founder of the MacCarthy Reagh dynasty, Princes of Carbery. The Ó Mathghamhna and Uí Echach are the powerful O'Mahonys, Kings of Eóganacht Raithlind.

Name or epithet
An Crom translates directly from the Irish into The Bent (One), recalling memories of the infamous deity Crom Cruach. However, in this case the source is probably Cromad, name for the bend in the River Maigue becoming the modern Croom, County Limerick. Crom is claimed in the O'Donovan pedigrees to have been seated here and built a great fortress, although this was more likely built by his ancestor/relation Diarmaid O'Donovan. It is the origin also of the war cry "Crom Abu" of the Kildare branch of the FitzGerald dynasty, who are said to have taken the fortress from Crom.

Issue
His wife or wives are unknown.  The following list, down to the Elizabethan period, sets forth Ancrom's descendants. Through the seventh generation from him, the descendants are as listed by Peregrine Clery and Duald MacFirbis, writing in 1632 and 1650, respectively.  Generations 8 through 11 are as set forth by John O'Donovan, in his Appendix to the Annals of the Four Masters.  The listing is at odds with other published pedigrees of Clan Cathail, which may be examined by referring to Richard F. Cronnelly's Irish Family History, and which drew upon the genealogy approved by General Richard O'Donovan (d. 1829), a direct descendant of Donal of the Hides (11th generation, below). Cronnelly disputed the synthesized pedigree compiled in the Appendix of Annals of the Four Masters, noting that Donal of the Hides' pedigree was very incorrectly given from the Book of MacFirbis by John O'Donovan.

 Cathal
 Tadg
 Murchad, Lord of Clancahill
 Rickard, Lord of Clancahill
 Conchobar
 Ragnall
 (Diarmaid) 
 Diarmaid
 Domhnall
 Tadhg
 Donal of the Hides, Lord of Clancahill, died 1584
 Diarmaid, slain 1581
 Other sons
 Donal II O'Donovan, last inaugurated Lord of Clancahill, died 1639
 Tadhg/Teige
 Tioboit, from whom the Sliocht Tioboid
 Murtogh
 Aengus
 Diarmaid, Lord of Clancahill
 Ragnall
 Domhnall
 Melaghlin
 Diarmaid
 Conchobar
 Aed
 Dermott
  Donough
 Ímar Ua Donnubáin, from whom the Sliocht Íomhair. Head of the entire family?  
 Máol Íosa mac Íomhair 
 Aneslis, had four sons, their descendants all belonging to the Sliocht Aineislis mhic an Chroim
 Donnchad Mor
 Rickard
 Walter
 Ragnall
 Lochlann
 Donnchad of Loch Crott, ancestor of Clann Lochlainn or Clan Loughlin/Clanloughlin
 Cathal
 Diarmaid
 Donnchadh, after whom the pedigree of the Lords of Clanloughlin becomes confused for three or four generations
 (Conchobhar)
 (Aedh)
 (Diarmaid)
 (Donnchadh)
 Domhnall na Cartan Ó Donnabháin, Lord of Clanloughlin
 Domhnall Og na Cartan Ó Donnabháin, Lord of Clanloughlin, died 1629

Of the remaining published septs the Sliocht Raghnaill and Sliocht Diarmada Rua are impossible to place exactly above because of the multiple occurrences of the names, while the later sept of O'Donovan's Cove are believed to descend from a near kinsman of Donal of the Hides. Finally the Sliocht Taidhg Mhic Niocaill and Clann Chonghalaigh, both also found within O'Donovan territory, possibly represent unrecorded generations.

Notes

References

 Burke, Bernard, and Hugh Montgomery-Massingberd, Burke's Irish Family Records. London: Burke's Peerage Ltd. 5th edition, 1976.
 Burke, Bernard and Ashworth Peter Burke, A Genealogical and Heraldic History of the Landed Gentry of Ireland. London: Harrison & Sons. 9th edition, 1899. pp. 341–2, 119–20
 Cronnelly, Richard F., Irish Family History, Part II: A History of the Clan Eoghan, or Eoghanachts. Dublin: Goodwin, Son, and Nethercott. 1864. O'Donovan pedigrees, pp. 252–64
 Lyons, J., and H. W. Gillman, "Togher Castle and District, County Cork", in Journal of the Cork Historical and Archaeological Society, Volume I, Second Series. 1895. pp. 481–97
 Ó Cléirigh, Cú Choigríche, The O'Clery Book of Genealogies. early-mid 17th century.
 O'Donovan, John (ed. & tr.), Annála Ríoghachta Éireann. Annals of the Kingdom of Ireland by the Four Masters, from the Earliest Period to the Year 1616. 7 vols. Dublin: Royal Irish Academy. 1848–51. 2nd edition, 1856. Volume III (pp. 352–3, notes), Volume VI (Appendix, Pedigree of O'Donovan, pp. 2430–83).
 O'Hart, John, Irish Pedigrees. Dublin: James Duffy and Co. 5th edition, 1892.
 Ó hInnse, Séamus (ed. & tr.) and Florence MacCarthy, Mac Carthaigh's Book, or Miscellaneous Irish Annals (A.D. 1114-1437). Dublin Institute for Advanced Studies. 1947.
 O'Mahony, Jeremiah, West Cork and its Story. 1961. 2nd edition, 1975.
 O'Mahony, John, A History of the O'Mahony Septs, reprinted from the Journal of the Cork Historical and Archaeological Society, Volumes 12–16, Second Series. 1906–1910.
 Ó Murchadha, Diarmuid, Family Names of County Cork. Cork: The Collins Press. 2nd edition, 1996.
 Wyndham-Quin, Caroline, and Edwin Windham-Quin, Memoirs of Adare Manor. Oxford: Messrs. Parker. 1865.

1254 deaths
13th-century Irish people
Medieval Gaels from Ireland
Crom
People from County Cork
Year of birth unknown